The Wheeler–Kohn House is a Queen Anne and Second Empire Style house in the Near South Side neighborhood of Chicago, Illinois, United States.  The house was built in 1870 by Otis L. Wheelock for Calvin Wheeler.

It was designated a Chicago Landmark on February 5, 1998, and it was listed on the U.S. National Register of Historic Places in 1999. The house currently serves as one of Chicago's few intimate bed and breakfast hotels, operating as the Wheeler Mansion.

References

Houses completed in 1870
Houses on the National Register of Historic Places in Chicago
Chicago Landmarks
Bed and breakfasts in Illinois